The University of Skövde (in Swedish: Högskolan i Skövde, HIS) is a state university in Skövde, Sweden. The University of Skövde was granted university status in 1983 and is now an academic institution with general and specialised educational programmes in topics like Business, Health, Biomedicine and Computer game design. Research, education, and PhD training at the university are divided on four schools; Bioscience, Business, Health and Education, Engineering Science, and Informatics. The university has approximately 9,000 students (4,000 FTE) in 50 undergraduate and 10 graduate programmes.

History 
The foundation for the university was laid in the 1970s by an act of the Swedish Parliament. The university was established in 1977. In its first year, the university offered 300 educational places. University status was achieved in 1983. The university moved to new premises in the mid-1980s in order to accommodate for a growing student body. The new campus was housed in the barracks of the former Göta Logistic Corps (T 2) in central Skövde. In the following decade, new buildings were added to the campus as the university grew in student count and the integration of the, until then, separate School of Health Sciences (Swedish: Hälsohögskolan) as the Institute for Health Sciences. In later years, the university has established itself as a modern higher education institution with programmes video game development, bioinformatics, and data science. Something that has contributed to establishing Skövde and the university as a hub for Swedish computer game development with initiatives like Sweden Game Arena, and for research and development in IT with initiatives like the start-up incubator  Science Park Skövde, considered to be an interface for science and local business.

Organisation

Administration
The university is a government agency under the Swedish Ministry of Education and Research. The Vice-Chancellor serves as the agency head and is supported by the university board which is responsible for making sure that the agency performs according to official decisions.

Schools
The university's operational activities are organised into five thematic institutions:
 The School of Bioscience
 The School of Business
 The School of Health and Education
 The School of Engineering Science
 The School of Informatics

Research Centres
The university's research is conducted by research centres and groups spread out over the five schools (above):
 Systems Biology
 Retailing and International Business
 Strategic Entrepreneurship
 Followership and Organizational resilience
 Knowledge and Innovation Management
 Professional Accounting Practices and Sustainability
 Virtual Engineering
 Health and Ageing
 Physical Activity, IT and Health
 Woman Child Family
 Distributed Real-Time Systems
 Information Systems
 Interaction Lab
 Media, Technology and Culture
 Skövde Artificial Intelligence Lab

Departments
The university's administration consists of eight departments:
 External Relations and Communication Office
 Academic Affairs Student Support Office
 University Library
 Estates and Facilities Office
 Finance Office
 Human Resources Office
 IT Services Office
 Executive Office

Rankings
In a quality assessment study of Swedish higher education conducted by the Swedish Higher Education Authority, the university ranked seventh in Sweden.

Vice-Chancellors 
1983-2001 Lars-Erik Johansson
2001-2010 
2010-2016 Sigbritt Karlsson
2017-2022 
2023-

Notable alumni
 Darko Šarović (Track & Field athlete)
 Niklas Åkerblad (artist)
 Coffee Stain Studios (video game studio)

See also 
List of universities in Sweden

References

External links
The University of Skövde - Official site

Skövde
1977 establishments in Sweden
Educational institutions established in 1977
Skövde